Suresh Krishna may refer to:

 Suresh Krishna (actor), Malayalam film actor
 Suresh Krishna (businessman) (born 1936), Chairman and Managing Director of Sundram Fasteners Limited
 Suresh Krishna (film director), Tamil film director